Conn Aerodrome  is located  east of Conn, Ontario, Canada.

References

Registered aerodromes in Ontario